Arnup is a surname. Notable people with the surname include:

Sally Arnup (1930–2015), English sculptor
John Arnup (1911–2005), Canadian judge
Arnup Cup, award in Canadian law student contest

See also
Arnot (surname)